The Boys' Doubles tournament of the 2018 European Junior Badminton Championships was held from September 11-16. French Doubles Thom Gicquel and Toma Junior Popov clinched this title in the last edition. Scottish Christopher Grimley / Matthew Grimley leads the seedings this year.

Seeded

 Christopher Grimley / Matthew Grimley (finals)
 Fabien Delrue / William Villeger (champions)
 Enrico Baroni / Giovanni Toti (third round)
 Rory Easton / Zach Russ (quarter-finals)
 Julien Carraggi / Jona van Nieuwkerke (third round)
 Klemen Lesnicar / Domen Lonzaric (second round)
 Glib Beketov / Mykhaylo Makhnovskiy (third round)
 Joan Monroy / Carlos Piris (third round)

Draw

Finals

Top Half

Section 1

Section 2

Section 3

Section 4

Bottom Half

Section 5

Section 6

Section 7

Section 8

References

External links 
Main Draw

European Junior Badminton Championships